Uramya indita is a species of fly in the genus Uramya of the family Tachinidae.

Distribution
United States, Mexico, El Salvador.

References

Insects described in 1861
Dexiinae
Diptera of North America
Taxa named by Francis Walker (entomologist)